Lukas Wernblom is a Swedish ice hockey forward who plays for the Malmö Redhawks of the SHL.

He is the son of former ice hockey player Magnus Wernblom.

Career statistics

References

External links

2000 births
Living people
Malmö Redhawks players
People from Örnsköldsvik Municipality
Swedish ice hockey left wingers
Sportspeople from Västernorrland County